Ralf Liivar (2 April 1903 – 14 June 1990) was an Estonian footballer. He played in thirteen matches for the Estonia national football team between 1924 and 1927. Liivar was part of the Estonian team at the 1924 Summer Olympics in Paris.

References

External links
 

1903 births
1990 deaths
Estonian footballers
Estonia international footballers
Footballers from Tallinn
Association football defenders
Olympic footballers of Estonia
Footballers at the 1924 Summer Olympics
JK Tallinna Kalev players